Siargao is a tear-drop shaped island in the Philippine Sea situated 196 kilometers southeast of Tacloban. The east coast is relatively straight with one deep inlet, Port Pilar. The coastline is marked by a succession of reefs, small points and white, sandy beaches. The neighboring islands and islets have similar landforms. Siargao is known as the surfing capital of the Philippines, and was voted the Best Island in Asia in the 2021 Conde Nast Travelers Readers awards.

The island is within the jurisdiction of the province of Surigao del Norte and is composed of the municipalities of Burgos, Dapa, Del Carmen, General Luna, San Benito, Pilar, San Isidro, and Santa Monica.

Etymology
The name originates from Visayan siargaw or saliargaw (Premna odorata), a mangrove species that grows on the islands.

History
The first recorded sighting by Europeans of Siargao Island was by Spanish navigator Bernardo de la Torre on board of the carrack San Juan de Letrán in 1543 when attempting to return from Sarangani to New Spain. It was charted as Isla de las Palmas (Palm Island in Spanish).

On December 16, 2021, Typhoon Rai struck the area as a Category 5 super typhoon. It left the island devastated, with many buildings damaged or demolished. It caused ₱20 billion ($400 million) in damages.

Geography
Siargao Island contains one of the largest mangrove forest reserves in Mindanao, covering an area of 4,871 hectares in Del Carmen. Long stretches of wetlands indicate a potential for commercial seaweed propagation. The extensive mangrove forests of the western coast in the Del Carmen area are home to the Indo-Pacific crocodile Crocodylus porosus.

Siargao Island is greatly influenced by the winds and currents coming uninterrupted from the Pacific Ocean, intensified by the Mindanao current running westward through the Siargao Strait. The tide of Siargao is diurnal with tidal curves typically present, especially on the east coast of the island.

The island's Pacific-facing reefs are situated on the edge of the Philippine Trench, and the extremely deep offshore waters assure the ocean swells have undiluted power when they encounter the many coral and rock reefs. Siargao has excellent surfing conditions, particularly during the southwest "habagat" monsoon from August to December when the prevailing wind is offshore.

There are several islands located off Siargao. The islands in General Luna include Guyam Island, Pansukian or Naked Island (a sandbar), and Daku Island. These are typically included in island-hopping tours that are popular activities being offered to tourists visiting the island.

In the western coast in the municipalities of Del Carmen and San Benito are numerous islands, most of which are covered in mangrove forests. These islands include Caob, Pagbasayan, Poneas, Tona, Laonan, and Kawhagan. The tourist attractions of Sugba Lagoon and Pamomoan Beach is located in Kawhagan. The westernmost island of Siargao is Halian (under the jurisdiction of Del Carmen), located in between Siargao and the Dinagat Islands.

Off the southern end of the island are the three Bucas Grande island groups. Two of which, East Bucas Grande and Middle Bucas Grande, are part of the municipality of Dapa, while the largest island, Bucas Grande, is contiguous to the municipality of Socorro. Bucas Grande is known for the tourist attractions of Sohoton Cove, Tiktikan Lake, and the Jellyfish Sanctuary, among others.

In the past, the island could be reached via a direct domestic flight from Manila to Surigao City and then by a ferry to the coastal towns of Dapa or Del Carmen. Now, Cebu Pacific has flights from Cebu-Siargao, vice versa as well as a Manila-Siargao route (it stops briefly in Cebu and passengers then switch to a smaller aircraft). In March 2017, both Cebu Pacific and SkyJet Airlines commenced direct flights to Sayak Airport (IAO) (aka "Siargao Airport") Siargao island from Manila Airport (MNL), the first direct flights to the island from the capital. Additionally, Philippine Airlines has been offering direct flights from Clark International Airport to Sayak Airport since July 1, 2018. There are plans to extend the runway of Sayak Airport in Siargao, to cater to the demands of growing tourists who will be visiting this island paradise.

Cloud 9
One of the well-known surfing spots in Siargao and the Philippines, with a reputation for thick, hollow tubes is "Cloud 9". This right-breaking reef wave is the site of the annual Siargao Cup, a domestic and international surfing competition sponsored by the provincial government of Surigao del Norte.

The wave was discovered by travelling surfers in the late 1980s. It was named by American photographer John Seaton Callahan after a chocolate bar of the same name and was featured in the United States-based Surfer magazine in March 1993. This surf trip to Siargao Island was named by Surfer as one of the "Ten Best Surf Trips of All Time" in 1995. Cloud 9 also has a reputation for being a relatively cheap destination for surfers with many accommodations, restaurants, and bars to choose from.
There are several other quality waves on Siargao and nearby islands such as Tombstones, but Cloud 9 has received more publicity than any other surf spot in the Philippines. While it is not the only wave in the Tuason Point and General Luna areas easily accessible via the long pier from the shoreline and without the need for a boat, it is easily the most popular, leading to overcrowding and the nickname of "Crowd 9" among surfers.

Siargao, particularly the municipality of General Luna and the Tuason Point area, is well known as "The Surfing Capital of the Philippines" with a reputation among surfers within the Philippines and the International scene.

Awards and recognition 
Out of the 85 destinations listed, Siargao, the surfing capital of the Philippines, is named as the best island in Asia in the annual Condé Nast Traveler (CNT) readers' choice awards for top islands to visit this 2021.

Gallery

See also
 Siargao (film)
 Surfing
 List of protected areas of the Philippines
 Kitesurfing

References

External links
Municipality of Del Carmen, Siargao, Philippines
Siargao Islands, Philippines
 

Islands of Surigao del Norte
Beaches of the Philippines
Surfing locations in the Philippines
Protected landscapes and seascapes of the Philippines
Tourist attractions in Surigao del Norte